Vincenzo Palumbo (born 17 May 1974) is a German former professional footballer who played as a striker. Over the course of his career, he has played mostly in Italy but also spent time with clubs in Germany and Switzerland.

Career
Palumbo was born in Heilbronn. He signed his first professional contract with Stuttgarter Kickers for the 1992–93 season. At the end of the season he signed for Swiss team FC Schaffhausen but this did not work out so he moved on.

Palumbu then joined FC Basel for their 1993–94 season under head-coach Claude Andrey. After playing in five test games Palumbu played his domestic league debut for the club in the home game in the St. Jakob Stadium on 21 August 1993 as Basel won 3–1 against Fribourg. During this season his team mates were the likes of Swiss international goalkeeper Stefan Huber, defenders Massimo Ceccaroni, Marco Walker and Samir Tabakovic, the midfielders Mario Cantaluppi, Martin Jeitziner, Admir Smajić and Ørjan Berg and the Swiss international striker Dario Zuffi. Together they won the promotion/relegation group and as Nationalliga B champions thus won promotion to the top flight of Swiss football, after six seasons in the second tier.

In his six months with the club Palumbo played a total of 14 games for Basel scoring two goals. Seven of these games were in the Nationalliga B, one in the Swiss Cup and six were friendly games. Both goal were scored during the test games.

Palumbo left Basel after the winter break of that season and moved on to play the rest of the season for german team TuS Paderborn-Neuhaus. For the 1994–95 season he signed for Servette FC, but did not become any playing time, so in the winter break he moved on to Chênois. Here he played a successful second half of the season. At the beginning of the 1995–96 season Palumbo moved to Italy and signed for Andria BAT and here he stayed for two and a half seasons. In January he signed for Empoli.

Palumbo's further stations in Italy include Delfino Pescara, Palermo, Torres Calcio, Pisa, Olbia Calcio, Virtus Casarano, Tavolara, U.S. Viterbese 1908, Nuorese Calcio, U.S.D. Castelsardo and finally F.B.C. Calangianus 1905.

References

Sources
 Die ersten 125 Jahre. Publisher: Josef Zindel im Friedrich Reinhardt Verlag, Basel. 
 Verein "Basler Fussballarchiv" Homepage

External links
 

1974 births
Living people
Sportspeople from Heilbronn
German sportspeople of Italian descent
German footballers
Italian footballers
Footballers from Baden-Württemberg
Association football forwards
Serie A players
2. Bundesliga players
FC Schaffhausen players
FC Basel players
Servette FC players
CS Chênois players
S.S. Fidelis Andria 1928 players
Empoli F.C. players
Delfino Pescara 1936 players
Palermo F.C. players
Pisa S.C. players
S.E.F. Torres 1903 players
German expatriate footballers
Italian expatriate footballers
German expatriate sportspeople in Switzerland
Italian expatriate sportspeople in Switzerland
Expatriate footballers in Switzerland